Kurbanpınar is a village in the Bayburt District, Bayburt Province, Turkey. Its population is 69 (2021).

References

Villages in Bayburt District